Beşiktaş Women’s Volleyball is the women's volleyball section of Turkish sports club Beşiktaş J.K. in İstanbul, Turkey. The club plays its home matches in BJK Akatlar Arena.

2021-22 Team Roster

Honours

National competitions
 Turkish Women's Volleyball League
 Runners-up (3): 1995-96, 1996-97, 2003-04
 Turkish Women's Volleyball Championship
 Champions (1): 1964-65

International competitions
  CEV Women's Challenge Cup
 Runners-up (1): 2013-14
  BVA Cup
 Champions (4): 2008, 2009, 2013, 2018

Past rosters
2013–14
Zeynep Seda Uslu, Seda Türkkan, Natalia Hanikoğlu, Marina Tumas, Dilek Kınık, Ayça Naz İhtiyaroğlu, Naz Döner, Dicle Nur Babat, Nilay Konar, Gabriela Koeva, Tülin Altıntaş, Selime İlyasoğlu, Paula Yamila Nizetich, Ceyda Aktaş
2012–13
Çağla Akın, Zeynep Seda Uslu, Natalia Hanikoğlu, Ana Lazarević, Funda Bilgi, Tülin Altıntaş, Fatma Sinem Karamuk, Dicle Nur Babat, Tuğba Toprak, Gabriela Koeva, Yağmur Koçyiğit, Aslı Köprülü, Ece Hocaoğlu, Tereza Rossi Matuszkova (Koç: Adnan Kıstak)

2011–12
Maiko Kano, Tanya Sabkova, Olena Gashuka Samsonova, Zülfiye Gündoğdu, Tuğçe Ergenç, Özlem Özçelik, Gülşah Olcay, Duygu Sipahioğlu, Yeliz Askan, Cansu Aydınoğulları, Pınar Eren, Sinem Barut, Hilal Yabuz, Gizem Giraygil (Koç: Bülent Karslıoğlu)

2010–11
Banu Toktamış, Cansu Aydınoğulları, Duygu Sipahioğlu, Gizem Sancak, Gülbahar Akgül, Gülşah Olcay, Hilal Yabuz,  Müge Şakar, Natalia Kulikova, Olesia Rykhliuk, Olga Savenchuk, Pelin Çelik, Pınar Eren, Sinem Barut, Yeliz Askan (Coach: Bülent Karslıoğlu) 

2009–10
Cansu Aydınoğulları, Duygu Sipahioğlu, Gizem Sancak, Hilal Yabuz, Jasna Majstorović, Melis Gürkaynak, Melis Şahin, Müge Şakar, Nilay Özdemir, Pınar Eren, Sanja Popović, Zeynep Seda Uslu, Tatiana Dos Santos, Yağmur Koçyiğit, Yeliz Askan (Coach: Bülent Karslıoğlu)

Notable players

 Pelin Çelik
 Eda Erdem
 Arzu Göllü
 Natalia Hanikoğlu 
 Yağmur Koçyiğit
 İpek Soroğlu
 Özlem Özçelik
 Zeynep Seda Uslu
 Çağla Akın
 Ece Hocaoğlu

 Gabriela Koeva

 Tereze Rossi Matuszkova

 Sanja Popović

 Maiko Kano

 Atika Bouagaa

 Mirela Delić
 Ana Lazarević

 Kim Oden

References

External links
 Official Beşiktaş Volleyball Website 
 Official Beşiktaş Volleyball Website 
 Turkish Volleyball Federastion official website 

Beşiktaş Volleyball
Women's volleyball teams in Turkey
Turkish volleyball clubs
Volleyball clubs established in 1961